Oksana Zubkovska (born 15 July 1981) is a Paralympian athlete from Ukraine competing mainly in category F12 long jump events. She won the gold medal in the women's long jump F12 event at the Summer Paralympics in 2008, 2012 and 2021.

External links
 
 

Living people
1981 births
Ukrainian female long jumpers
Paralympic athletes of Ukraine
World record holders in Paralympic athletics
Athletes (track and field) at the 2008 Summer Paralympics
Athletes (track and field) at the 2012 Summer Paralympics
Athletes (track and field) at the 2020 Summer Paralympics
Paralympic gold medalists for Ukraine
Medalists at the 2008 Summer Paralympics
Medalists at the 2012 Summer Paralympics
Medalists at the 2020 Summer Paralympics
Paralympic medalists in athletics (track and field)
21st-century Ukrainian women